A chambon is a training device used on horses.

Chambon may also refer to:

Places
 Chambon, Charente-Maritime, in the Charente-Maritime département
 Chambon, Cher, in the Cher département
 Chambon, Gard, in the Gard département
 Chambon, Indre-et-Loire, in the Indre-et-Loire département
 Chambon-la-Forêt, in the Loiret département
 Chambon-le-Château, in the Lozère département
 Chambon-Sainte-Croix, in the Creuse département
 Chambon-sur-Cisse, in the Loir-et-Cher département
 Chambon-sur-Dolore, in the Puy-de-Dôme département
 Chambon-sur-Lac, in the Puy-de-Dôme département
 Chambon-sur-Voueize, in the Creuse département
 Le Chambon, Ardèche, in the Ardèche département
 Le Chambon-Feugerolles, in the Loire département
 Le Chambon-sur-Lignon, in the Haute-Loire département

Lakes
 Lac de Chambon, artificial lake in the Indre département
 Lac Chambon, volcanic lake in the Puy-de-Dôme département
 Lac du Chambon, artificial lake in the Isère département

People with the surname
 Emile Chambon (1905–1993), Swiss painter
 Nicolas Chambon (1748-1826), French politician who served as Mayor of Paris from 1792 to 1793.
 Pierre Chambon, French biochemist and a genetist
 Marie Martha Chambon, French Roman Catholic nun

French-language surnames